The International Indian Film Academy Awards, popularly known as IIFA, is an annual awards ceremony for Bollywood. Produced by Wizcraft International Entertainment Pvt. Ltd, the winners of the awards are decided by fans, who vote online for their favourite actors from the Hindi film industry. Instituted in 2000, the ceremony is held in different countries around the world every year.

The IIFA Utsavam is the South Indian segment of the annual IIFA Awards. The awards were introduced in 2016, around the films released in 2015. The 1st IIFA Utsavam was held on 24 and 25 January 2016 at the Gachibowli Athletic Stadium, Hyderabad, India.

History
The first awards were presented in 2000 at The Millennium Dome in London, United Kingdom. From then onwards, the awards are held at locations around the world signifying the international success of Bollywood. Since 2000, the event has expanded from a one-night event to a three-day celebration, hosting various events and activities relating to the Indian film industry.

These awards honour films from the previous calendar year. Amitabh Bachchan is the Brand Ambassador of the IIFA since its inception. In its 10th year (2009), five special awards were introduced: Star of the Decade (Male and Female), Movie of the Decade, Music of the Decade, and Director of the Decade.

Awards ceremonies
The following is a listing of all International Indian Film Academy Awards ceremonies since 2000.

Awards

Popular awards
 Best Film
 Best Director
 Best Actor
 Best Actress
 Best Supporting Actor
 Best Supporting Actress
 Best Performance in a Negative Role(2000–2017)
 Best Performance in a Comic Role(2000–2017)
 Star Debut of the Year – Male
 Star Debut of the Year – Female
 Best Music Director
 Best Lyricist
 Best Playback Singer Male
 Best Playback Singer Female
 Best Story

Special awards
 IIFA Lifetime Achievement Award
 Style Icon
 Style Diva
 Most Glamorous Star of the Year
 Best On-Screen Beauty
 Contribution to a Greener Earth
 Face of the Year
 Entertainer of the Year
 Special Award for Global Impact
 Outstanding Contribution to Indian cinema
 Outstanding Achievement in Indian cinema
 Outstanding Achievement by an Indian in International Cinema
 Artists of the Decade

Technical awards
 Best Art Direction (2000–2017)
 Best Action (2000–2017)
 Best Background Score
 Best Cinematography
 Best Choreography
 Best Costume Design (2000–2017)
 Best Dialogue
 Best Editing
 Best Sound Design
 Best Makeup (2000–2017)
 Best Screenplay
 Best Song Recording (2000–2017)
 Best Sound Recording
 Best Sound Re-Recording
 Best Special Effects

Records and facts
 Most awards to a single film
 3 Idiots (2009) – 18
 Devdas (2002) – 16
 Kal Ho Naa Ho (2003) – 14
 Barfi! (2012) – 14
 Bhaag Milkha Bhaag (2013) – 14

 Most acting awards – male (Best Actor + Best Supporting Actor)
 Hrithik Roshan (4+0) = 4

 Shahrukh Khan (4+0) = 4

 Most acting awards – female (Best Actress + Best Supporting Actress)
 Rani Mukerji (3+1) = 4

 Most directing awards
 
Sanjay Leela Bhansali – 4

 Most music awards (Best Music Director + Best Background Score)
 A. R. Rahman (7+3) = 10

 Most singing awards
 Shreya Ghoshal = 8
 Sonu Nigam = 4
 Arijit Singh = 4

See also
 IIFA Utsavam
 Bollywood
 Cinema of India

References

External links

 IIFA.com Official website
 IIFA 2014 Rocks with Stars at Tampa Bay
IIFA To Be Held In Kathmandu Nepal

 
Awards established in 2000
2000 establishments in India
2000 in Indian cinema
IIFA awards